Colin Ryan may refer to:
Colin Ryan (Clare hurler) (born 1988), Irish hurler for Clare
Colin Ryan (actor) (born 1986), English actor
Colin Ryan (Limerick hurler) (born 1996), Irish hurler

See also